The Walpole–Algonac Ferry serves the city of Algonac, Michigan, and the First Nation reserve of Walpole Island, and (indirectly), Wallaceburg, Ontario, via Highway 40 and Chatham-Kent Road 32. It serves as a border crossing of the Canada–United States border.

The Walpole–Algonac Ferry Line has been in operation for over 100 years.  Operating out of Walpole Island (Ontario, Canada), the ferry crosses the St. Clair River to Algonac (Michigan, USA) and is the closest route between Detroit and Chatham/Wallaceburg/London/Toronto areas.  The two-ferry operation (12 car and 9 car) runs daily, year-round (weather permitting), with a crossing time of approximately seven minutes.

External links 

Ferries of Michigan
Ferries of Ontario
St. Clair River
Transportation in St. Clair County, Michigan
Transport in Lambton County
Canada–United States border crossings